Burrowing Owl Conservation Network is a United States-based, 501(c)(3) non-profit organization founded in 2008 and is dedicated to "the protection and restoration of burrowing owls and promot[ing] the preservation and careful management of habitat to prevent loss, foster healthy populations, and maintain intact natural communities for an ecologically sound future." The organization is active in California political intervention aimed at burrowing owl protection, and fundraising used for conservation, education and outreach, raptor research, and advocacy. The organization's efforts include habitat protection, ecosystem restoration, collaborations with private lands owners, government agencies and non-profit organizations, and installation of artificial burrows.

The organization was originally named "Friends of East Bay Owls" and its mission was focused on protecting burrowing owls and habitat in East Bay. The organization's mission and work has expanded throughout California and North America. The organization has offices in Visalia, Berkeley and Redding, California. The Burrowing Owl Conservation Network is a project of Earth Island Institute.

Conservation Strategy Petition
Burrowing Owl Conservation Network spearheaded a 2011 statewide petition for the "immediate development, release for public comment and implementation of a Comprehensive Conservation Strategy for Burrowing Owls." This petition was a joint project with Defenders of Wildlife and was signed by 22 other California organizations representing more than 209,000 Californians.

Earth Island Institute
Burrowing Owl Conservation Network was adopted by Earth Island Institute on July 24, 2010. Earth Island Institute provides Burrowing Owl Conservation Network with fiscal sponsorship and administrative support for their grassroots efforts.

References

External links
 BurrowingOwlConservation.org

Environmental organizations based in California
Ornithological organizations in the United States
Environmental organizations established in 2008
2008 establishments in California